Aleksander Gerassimov-Kalvet (11 February 1904 – 13 March 1970) was an Estonian professional footballer who played as a forward for the Estonia national football team.

Career
Gerassimov-Kalvet played for Tallinna Sport where he finished two-times as a top scorer in the Estonian championship. He was registered in the list of players for Estonia during the Olympic Games of 1924. However, he was one of the six reserve players who remained in the country, thus, not playing a game for the Olympics. He was selected to play for Estonia on 18 July 1930, in a friendly match against Sweden, during which he scored a goal.

References

External links
 
 

1904 births
1970 deaths
Estonian footballers
Estonia international footballers
Association football forwards
Olympic footballers of Estonia
Footballers at the 1924 Summer Olympics